Two of a Kind may refer to:

Film and television
Two of a Kind (1951 film), starring Edmond O'Brien and Lizabeth Scott
Two of a Kind (1982 film), starring George Burns and Robbie Benson
Two of a Kind (1983 film), starring Olivia Newton-John and John Travolta
Two of a Kind (soundtrack), the soundtrack of the film
Two of a Kind (1993 film) (Qing ren zhi ji), directed by Teddy Chan
Two of a Kind (Hong Kong TV series), a 1989 Hong Kong television series starring Hacken Lee 
Two of a Kind (UK TV series), a 1960s ATV television series starring Eric Morecambe & Ernie Wise
Two of a Kind (U.S. TV series), a 1998 ABC television series starring Mary-Kate and Ashley Olsen
2-of-a-Kind, a 1992–95 Cartoon Network programming block

Music
Two of a Kind (Bobby Darin and Johnny Mercer album), 1961, or the title track
Two of a Kind (Porter Wagoner and Dolly Parton album), 1971
Two of a Kind (Earl Klugh and Bob James album), 1982
Two of a Kind (Ray Drummond and John Hicks album), 1989
Two of a Kind (Katie and Maggie Noonan album), 2004
Two of a Kind: Groovemasters, Vol. 8, a 2002 album by guitarists Pat Donohue and Mike Rowling
"Two of a Kind", a song by rock band AFI from Answer That and Stay Fashionable
"Two of a Kind", a song from Syd Barrett's  album The Peel Session
"2 of a Kind", a song by German group Monrose from Temptation
"2 of a Kind", a song by American singer Vanessa Williams on her album The Comfort Zone